Luxembourg competed at the 1960 Summer Olympics in Rome, Italy. 52 competitors, 47 men and 5 women, took part in 48 events in 10 sports.

Athletics

Boxing

Canoeing

Cycling

Six cyclists represented Luxembourg in 1960.

Individual road race
 Roby Hentges
 René Andring
 Roger Thull
 Louis Grisius

Team time trial
 Nico Pleimling
 René Andring
 Louis Grisius
 Raymond Bley

Fencing

Ten fencers, eight men and two women, represented Luxembourg in 1960.

Men's foil
 Jean Link
 Édouard Didier
 Robert Schiel

Men's team foil
 Jean Link, Robert Schiel, Édouard Didier, Roger Theisen, Jean-Paul Olinger

Men's épée
 Eddi Gutenkauf
 Robert Schiel
 Roger Theisen

Men's team épée
 Roger Theisen, Edy Schmit, Robert Schiel, Rudy Kugeler, Eddi Gutenkauf

Women's foil
 Colette Flesch
 Ginette Rossini

Gymnastics

Shooting

Four shooters represented Luxembourg in 1960.

50 m pistol
 François Fug

50 m rifle, three positions
 Victor Kremer

50 m rifle, prone
 Victor Kremer

Trap
 Marcel Chennaux
 Aly Knepper

Swimming

Weightlifting

Wrestling

References

External links
Official Olympic Reports

Nations at the 1960 Summer Olympics
1960
1960 in Luxembourgian sport